Innocence is the second extended play by South Korean duo Davichi, released on May 6, 2010. "Time, Please Stop" was used as the promotional song.

Promotions
After the massive success of their previous extended play and their first concert, Davichi announced in the beginning of March that they would be returning with another extended play. It was originally scheduled to be released towards the end of March, but the group's comeback was pushed to May due to member Min-kyung's injury in a car accident. The lead single, "Time, Please Stop" had a distinctive ballad-punk rock mixture and was supposed to take on a heavier tone than their previous release "8282". Label mate Eunjung from the girl group T-ara starred in the song's music video, which portrayed a modern-day version of Snow White.

Track listing

References

2010 EPs
Davichi albums